The 2010 World Fencing Championships were held at the Grand Palais in Paris, France 4–13 November.

Medal table

Men's events

Women's events

Participating nations 
A record of 110 nations competed, with many making their debuts including Curaçao and Sri Lanka among others.

  (1)
  (13)
  (3)
  (1)
  (17)
  (10)
  (2)
  (1)
  (11)
  (5)
  (1)
  (22)
  (1)
  (6)
  (1)
  (2)
  (23)
  (8)
  (31)
  (10)
  (2)
  (4)
  (5)
  (1)
  (1)
  (1)
  (14)
  (2)
  (1)
  (9)
  (1)
  (3)
  (8)
  (8)
  (8)
  (39)
  (1)
  (25)
  (17)
  (1)
  (1)
  (1)
  (23)
  (34)
  (3)
  (9)
  (1)
  (8)
  (13)
  (2)
  (18)
  (32)
  (25)
  (1)
  (31)
  (5)
  (7)
  (6)
  (1)
  (6)
  (2)
  (1)
  (1)
  (4)
  (7)
  (3)
  (3)
  (2)
  (1)
  (1)
  (9)
  (1)
  (1)
  (2)
  (1)
  (7)
  (3)
  (1)
  (2)
  (42)
  (8)
  (7)
  (22)
  (41)
  (5)
  (6)
  (7)
  (7)
  (2)
  (2)
  (14)
  (25)
  (16)
  (1)
  (6)
  (8)
  (5)
  (1)
  (15)
  (1)
  (10)
  (13)
  (33)
  (27)
  (32)
  (1)
  (2)
  (3)
  (24)
  (1)

External links
 FIE
 Organizing Committee official website

 
World Fencing Championships
W
Fencing Championships
Fencing
World Fencing Championships
International fencing competitions hosted by France
World Fencing Championships